The 1953 Wimbledon Championships took place on the outdoor grass courts at the All England Lawn Tennis and Croquet Club in Wimbledon, London, United Kingdom. The tournament was held from Monday 22 June until Saturday 4 July 1953. It was the 67th staging of the Wimbledon Championships, and the third Grand Slam tennis event of 1953. Vic Seixas and Maureen Connolly won the singles titles.

Finals

Seniors

Men's singles

 Vic Seixas defeated  Kurt Nielsen, 9–7, 6–3, 6–4

Women's singles

 Maureen Connolly defeated  Doris Hart  8–6, 7–5

Men's doubles

 Lew Hoad /  Ken Rosewall defeated  Rex Hartwig /  Mervyn Rose, 6–4, 7–5, 4–6, 7–5

Women's doubles

 Shirley Fry /  Doris Hart defeated  Maureen Connolly /  Julia Sampson, 6–0, 6–0

Mixed doubles

 Vic Seixas /  Doris Hart defeated  Enrique Morea /  Shirley Fry, 9–7, 7–5

Juniors

Boys' singles

 Billy Knight defeated  Ramanathan Krishnan, 7–5, 6–4

Girls' singles

 Dora Kilian defeated  Valerie Pitt, 6–4, 4–6, 6–1

References

External links
 Official Wimbledon Championships website

 
Wimbledon Championships
Wimbledon Championships
Wimbledon Championships
Wimbledon Championships